Cordylomera is a genus of longhorn beetles in the tribe Elaphidiini.

Species 
 Cordylomera acuminata (Fabricius, 1776)
 Cordylomera annulicornis Fairmaire, 1892
 Cordylomera apicalis Thomson, 1858
 Cordylomera atkinsoni Duffy, 1952
 Cordylomera basilewskyi Fuchs, 1971
 Cordylomera cervalhoi Veiga Ferreira, 1971
 Cordylomera comoensis Adlbauer, 2000
 Cordylomera copei Adlbauer, 2001
 Cordylomera delahayei Adlbauer, 2006
 Cordylomera elegans Distant, 1904
 Cordylomera etiennei Quentin & Villiers, 1979
 Cordylomera filicornis Duffy, 1952
 Cordylomera geniculata Buquet, 1843
 Cordylomera gracilis Veiga Ferreira, 1965
 Cordylomera gratiosa Murray, 1870
 Cordylomera heimi Teocchi, 1971
 Cordylomera inornata Duffy, 1952
 Cordylomera karschi Quedenfeldt, 1883
 Cordylomera laetitiae Teocchi, 1971
 Cordylomera lepesmei Duffy, 1952
 Cordylomera mourgliai Adlbauer, 1994
 Cordylomera nyassae Ferreira, 1957
 Cordylomera parva Ferreira, 1954
 Cordylomera principalis Distant, 1898
 Cordylomera puchneri Adlbauer, 2004
 Cordylomera rotundicollis Duffy, 1952
 Cordylomera ruficornis Chevrolat, 1855
 Cordylomera schmidi Adlbauer, 2015
 Cordylomera schoenherri Fåhraeus, 1872
 Cordylomera spinicornis (Fabricius, 1775)
 Cordylomera testacea Buquet, 1843
 Cordylomera vittata Jordan, 1903
 Cordylomera wieringai Adlbauer, 2001
 Cordylomera zambesiana Péringuey, 1855

References

External links 
 Cordylomera at Biolib.cz

Cerambycidae genera
Elaphidiini